Be Quick '28 is a football club from Zwolle, Netherlands, which was founded on 22 November 1928. They currently play in the Eerste Klasse.

Staff & Board Members 
 Physio :   Hans Beverwijk

External links 
 Official Site

 
Association football clubs established in 1928
1928 establishments in the Netherlands
Football clubs in the Netherlands
Football clubs in Zwolle